The Toronto Comic Arts Festival (TCAF) is a comic book festival held annually in Toronto, Ontario. Founded in 2003, TCAF has grown to become one of the world’s largest festivals dedicated to the promotion and appreciation of comic arts.

Programming
TCAF focuses on alternative and independent comics, but includes other creative arts besides comics. Unlike traditional comic book conventions, TCAF is modeled off of independent comic festivals and art book fairs such as the Angoulême International Comics Festival and Small Press Expo.

TCAF is a free-admission event.

Page & Panel: The TCAF Shop
"Page & Panel: The TCAF Shop" is a non-profit store located in the Toronto Reference Library. Opened in May 2015, the  shop sells books and merchandise that fund the festival and related activities.

History
TCAF was founded by Peter Birkemoe and Chris Butcher of The Beguiling in 2003. The festival was held biennially until 2009, when in partnership with the Toronto Public Library it became an annual event.  Starting that year, the festival took place at the Toronto Reference Library.

Event history

References

External links
 TCAF official website

Comics conventions in Canada
Book fairs in Canada
May events
Annual events in Toronto
Recurring events established in 2003
2003 establishments in Ontario
Festivals established in 2003
Comics conventions
Literary festivals in Ontario